Utricularia capillacea is a species of carnivorous plant from the Lentibulariaceae family, Lamiales order, described by Carl Ludwig Willdenow. According to the Catalogue of Life Utricularia capillacea does not have known subspecies.

References

capillacea